The Unified Task Force (UNITAF) was a United States-led, United Nations-sanctioned multinational force which operated in Somalia from 5 December 1992 until 4 May 1993. A United States initiative (code-named Operation Restore Hope), UNITAF was charged with carrying out United Nations Security Council Resolution 794 to create a protected environment for conducting humanitarian operations in the southern half of the country.

After the killing of 24 Pakistani peacekeepers in early June, the Security Council changed UNOSOM II's mandate issuing the Resolution 837, which established that UNOSOM troops could use "all necessary measures" to guarantee the delivery of humanitarian aid in accordance to Chapter VII of the United Nations Charter.

Background 
Faced with a humanitarian disaster in Somalia, exacerbated by a complete breakdown in civil order, the United Nations had created the UNOSOM I mission in April 1992. However, the complete intransigence of the local faction leaders operating in Somalia and their rivalries with each other meant that UNOSOM I could not be performed. The mission never reached its mandated strength.

Over the final quarter of 1992, the situation in Somalia continued to worsen. Factions were splintering into smaller factions, and then splintered again. Agreements for food distribution with one party were worthless when the stores had to be shipped through the territory of another. Three hundred thousand Somalis had already starved to death, and 1.5 million were at risk of starvation. Some elements were actively opposing the UNOSOM intervention. Troops were shot at, aid ships attacked and prevented from docking, cargo aircraft were fired upon and aid agencies, public and private, were subject to threats, looting and extortion. By November, General Mohamed Farrah Aidid had grown confident enough to defy the Security Council formally and demand the withdrawal of peacekeepers, as well as declaring hostile intent against any further UN deployments.

In the face of mounting public pressure and frustration, UN Secretary-General Boutros Boutros-Ghali presented several options to the Security Council. Diplomatic avenues having proved largely fruitless, he recommended that a significant show of force was required to bring the armed groups to heel. Chapter VII of the Charter of the United Nations allows for "action by air, sea or land forces as may be necessary to maintain or restore international peace and security." Boutros-Ghali believed the time had come for employing this clause and moving on from peacekeeping.

However, Boutros-Ghali felt that such action would be difficult to apply under the mandate for UNOSOM. Moreover, he realised that solving Somalia's problems would require such a large deployment that the UN Secretariat did not have the skills to command and control it. Accordingly, he recommended that a large intervention force be constituted under the command of member states but authorised by the Security Council to carry out operations in Somalia. The goal of this deployment was "to prepare the way for a return to peacekeeping and post-conflict peace-building".

Following this recommendation, on 3 December 1992 the Security Council unanimously adopted Resolution 794, authorizing the use of "all necessary means to establish as soon as possible a secure environment for humanitarian relief operations in Somalia". The Security Council urged the Secretary-General and member states to make arrangements for "the unified command and control" of the military forces that would be involved.

UNITAF has been considered part of a larger state building initiative in Somalia, serving as the military arm to secure the distribution of humanitarian aid. However, UNITAF cannot be considered a state building initiative due to its specific, limited and palliative aims, which it nonetheless exercised forcefully. The primary objective of UNITAF was security rather than larger institution building initiatives.

Composition 

The vast bulk of UNITAF's total personnel strength was provided by the United States (some 25,000 out of a total of 37,000 personnel). Other countries that contributed to UNITAF were Australia, Bangladesh, Belgium, Botswana, Canada, Egypt, Ethiopia, France, Germany, Greece, India, Ireland, Italy, Kuwait, Morocco, New Zealand, Nigeria, Norway, Pakistan, Saudi Arabia, Spain, Sweden, Tunisia, Turkey, United Arab Emirates, the United Kingdom, and Zimbabwe.

The U.S. Central Command (USCINCCENT) established Joint Task Force (JTF) Somalia to perform Operation Restore Hope. The I Marine Expeditionary Force (I MEF) staff made up the core of the JTF headquarters. (The name of this command started as CJTF Somalia but changed to United Task Force-UNITAF). The CJTF commanded Marine forces from I MEF (referred to as MARFOR Somalia) and Army forces from the
10th Mountain Division (referred to as ARFOR Somalia), as well as Air Force and Navy personnel and units. There were also special operations forces components, in addition to the forces provided by countries contributing to the US-led, combined coalition.

The national contingents were co-ordinated and overseen by U.S. Central Command, however, the relationship between CentCom and the contributing nations varied. There were a few confrontations over the methods and mandates employed by some contingents. For example, the Italian contingent was accused of bribing local militias to maintain peace, whilst the French Foreign Legion troops were accused of over-vigorous use of force in disarming militiamen. The Canadian contingent of the operation was known by the Canadian operation name Operation Deliverance.

United States 

Prior to Resolution 794, the United States had approached the UN and offered a significant troop contribution to Somalia, with the caveat that these personnel would not be commanded by the UN. Resolution 794 did not specifically identify the U.S. as being responsible for the future task force, but mentioned "the offer by a Member State described in the Secretary-General's letter to the Council of 29 November 1992 (S/24868) concerning the establishment of an operation to create such a secure environment". Resolution 794 was unanimously adopted by the United Nations Security Council on 3 December 1992, and they welcomed the United States offer to help create a secure environment for humanitarian efforts in Somalia. President George H. W. Bush responded to this by initiating Operation Restore Hope on 4 December 1992, under which the United States would assume command in accordance with Resolution 794.

Larry Freedman, a CIA paramilitary officer from the Special Activities Division,  became the first U.S. casualty of the conflict in Somalia when his vehicle struck an anti-tank mine. He had been inserted prior to official U.S. presence on a special reconnaissance mission, serving as a liaison between the U.S. Embassy and the arriving military forces while providing intelligence for both. Freedman was a former Army Delta Force operator and Special Forces soldier and had served in every conflict that the United States was involved in both officially and unofficially since Vietnam. Freedman was awarded the Intelligence Star for extraordinary heroism.

The first Marines of UNITAF landed on the beaches of Somalia on 9 December 1992 amid a media circus. The press "seemed to know the exact time and place of the Marines' arrival" and waited on the airport runway and beaches to capture the moment.

Critics of U.S. involvement argued that the U.S. government was intervening so as to gain control of oil concessions for American companies, with a survey of Northeast Africa by the World Bank and UN ranking Somalia second only to Sudan as the top prospective producer. However, no American and UN troops were deployed in proximity to the major oil exploration areas in the northeastern part of the country or the autonomous Somaliland region in the northwest. The intervention happened twenty-two months after the fall of Barre's regime. Other critics explain the intervention as the administration's way to maintain the size and expenditures of the post-Cold War military establishment, to deflect criticism for the president's failure to act in Bosnia, or to leave office on a high note. To many in the administration, the intervention seemed like an optimal case for the use of military force – the chances of success seemed high, while the political risks and the danger to U.S. troops appeared to be limited. Acting Secretary of State Eagleburger described the situation in Somalia as "a tragedy of massive proportions, and, underline this, one that we could do something about.”

Operation 

The operation began on 6 December 1992, when Navy SEALs and special warfare combatant-craft crewmen from Naval Special Warfare Task Unit TRIPOLI began conducting beach and port hydrographic and reconnaissance survey operations in the vicinity of the landing beach, airport, and harbor. These operations lasted three days. In the early hours of 8 December 1992, elements of the 4th Psychological Operations Group attached to the 15th Marine Expeditionary Unit (MEU) conducted leaflet drops over the capital city of Mogadishu. Although initially unopposed, the uncertain operating environment required using nonlinear, simultaneous forcible entry operations along multiple lines of operation from selected afloat and ashore basing throughout the amphibious operations area.

The MEU's ground combat element, Battalion Landing Team (BLT) 2nd Battalion, 9th Marines (2/9) along with Delta Battery 2nd Battalion 12th Marines, performed simultaneous ship to objective amphibious assaults on the Port of Mogadishu and Mogadishu International Airport, establishing a foothold for additional incoming troops. Echo and Golf Company assaulted the airport by helicopter and Amphibious Assault Vehicles, while Fox Company secured the port with an economy of force rubber boat assault. The 1st Marine Division's Air Contingency Battalion (ACB), 1st Battalion, 7th Marines, as well as 3rd Battalion, 11th Marines (3/11 is an artillery battalion but operated as a provisional infantry battalion while in Somalia), arrived soon after the airport was secured. Elements of BLT 2/9's India Co, and 1/7 went on to secure the airport in Baidoa and the city of Bardera, while BLT 2/9's Golf Company, and elements of the Belgian Special Forces, conducted an amphibious landing at the port city of Kismayo. Air support was provided by the combined helicopter units of HMLA-267, HMH-363, HMH-466, HMM-164, and HC-11's DET 10.

Concurrently, various Somali factions returned to the negotiating table in an attempt to end the civil war. This effort was known as the Conference on National Reconciliation in Somalia and it resulted in the Addis Ababa Agreement signed on 27 March 1993. The conference, however, had little result as the civil war continued afterwards.

Results 

As UNITAF's mandate was to protect the delivery of food and other humanitarian aid, the operation was regarded as a success. United Nations Secretary-General Boutros Boutros-Ghali determined that the presence of UNITAF troops had a "positive impact on the security situation in Somalia and on the effective delivery of humanitarian assistance." An estimated 100,000 lives were saved as a result of outside assistance. Chester Crocker estimated that the intervention saved a quarter of a million Somali lives.

One day prior to the signing of the Addis Ababa Agreement, the United Nations Security Council passed Resolution 814, which marked the transfer of power from UNITAF to UNOSOM II, a United Nations led force. The major change in policy that the transition from UNITAF to UNOSOM II entailed is that the new mandate included the responsibility of nation-building on the multinational force. On 3 May 1993, UNOSOM II officially assumed command, and on 4 May 1993 it assumed responsibility for the operations.

Operation Continue Hope provided support of UNOSOM II to establish a secure environment for humanitarian relief operations by providing personnel, logistical, communications, intelligence support, a quick reaction force, and other elements as required. Navy ships were involved, from the unit USS Peleliu Amphibious Readiness Group.  The ships included the ship USS Anchorage,  USS Peleliu, USS Duluth, USS Frederick.  The Marine units from 11th Marine Expeditionary Unit (MEU) were involved.  The USS Anchorage docked at the port of Mogadishu and spent several days there.  Over 60 Army aircraft and approximately 1,000 aviation personnel operated in Somalia from 1992 to 1994.

No disarmament of the rivaling factions within Somalia was undertaken. This meant that the situation stayed stable only for the time UNITAF's overwhelming presence was deterring the fighting. Therefore, the mandate to create a "secure environment" was not achieved in a durable fashion. The Canadian Airborne Regiment was disbanded due to its conduct at UNITAF that was revealed during an investigation into the Somalia Affair.

Transition 

UNITAF was only intended as a transitional body. Once a secure environment had been restored, the suspended UNOSOM mission would be revived, albeit in a much more robust form. On 3 March 1993, the Secretary-General submitted to the Security Council his recommendations for effecting the transition from UNITAF to UNOSOM II. He noted that despite the size of the UNITAF mission, a secure environment was not yet established and there was still no effective functioning government or local security/police force.
The Secretary-General concluded therefore, that, should the Security Council determine that the time had come for the transition from UNITAF to UNOSOM II, the latter should be endowed with enforcement powers under Chapter VII of the United Nations Charter to establish a secure environment throughout Somalia. UNOSOM II would therefore seek to complete the task begun by UNITAF for the restoration of peace and stability in Somalia. The new mandate would also empower UNOSOM II to assist the Somali people in rebuilding their economic, political and social life, through achieving national reconciliation so as to recreate a democratic Somali State.

UNOSOM II was established by the Security Council in Resolution 814 on 26 March 1993 and formally took over operations in Somalia when UNITAF was dissolved on 4 May 1993.

References

Footnotes

Bibliography

External links 

 
 UN Department of Peacekeeping: UNOSOM 1 Archived
 UN Department of Peacekeeping: UNOSOM 2 Archived
 Global Security on Operation Restore Hope Archived
 Bibliography of Contingency Operations: Somalia (Restore Hope) compiled by the U.S. Army Center of Military History, Archived

Battles involving Botswana
Humanitarian military operations
Military operations involving Australia
Military operations involving Belgium
Military operations involving India
Military operations involving Italy
Military operations involving Malaysia
Military operations involving New Zealand
Military operations involving Pakistan
Military operations involving the United Kingdom
Military operations involving the United States
Pakistan military presence in other countries
Somali Civil War
Somalia–United States relations
United Nations operations in Somalia
United Nations Security Council subsidiary organs
United States Marine Corps in the 20th century